Tiki Gardens is an unincorporated community and census-designated place (CDP) in Hawaii County, Hawaii, United States. It is on the eastern side of the island of Hawaii and is bordered to the north by Orchidlands Estates, to the south by Ainaloa, and to the west by Hawaiian Acres.

Tiki Gardens was first listed as a CDP prior to the 2020 census.

Demographics

References 

Census-designated places in Hawaii County, Hawaii
Census-designated places in Hawaii
Unincorporated communities in Hawaii County, Hawaii